Maurice Albert Dallimore (23 June 1912 – 20 February 1973) was an English actor who lived and worked mostly in the United States. Most noted for portraying proper British character roles, he appeared as a regular or recurring character on many TV shows which included such series as  77 Sunset Strip, The Jack Benny Show, the ABC-TV series Honey West, McHale's Navy, the ABC-TV series Batman, where he appeared as Superintendent Watson, I Dream of Jeannie, The Monkees and Fair Exchange. He appeared in an episode of The Tab Hunter Show in 1961. In 1965, he appeared on Petticoat Junction, playing Faversham in the episode "The Butler Did It". He also appeared in an episode of the Rifleman.

Dallimore died in Hollywood, California on 20 February 1973, of Laennec's cirrhosis. He was 60 years old.  Maurice married Gertrude Bernice Larson 1909-1970 on 2 June 1961 in Middlebury Connecticut.  She was the daughter of Andrew Larson 1876-1937 and Sarah Bryan 1878-1947.<ref>Petition for Naturalization #254950<ref>.

Filmography

References

External links

1912 births
1973 deaths
Male actors from Essex
English male film actors
English male television actors
20th-century English male actors